Havana Meets Kingston is a collaboration between the musicians of Cuba and Jamaica.

In 2015 Australian producer Mista Savona (born Jake Dominic Savona) flew a group of Jamaican musicians into Cuba to record a full length album bringing together the musicians and artists of both islands. The resulting album Havana Meets Kingston was released in 2017. Recorded at EGREM Studios in Centro Habana, Cuba, the album was described by Readings as “a one-of-a-kind musical project…Jake is pioneering a new frontier of cross-cultural musical exchange.” Musicians featured on the album include Jamaican rhythm section Sly and Robbie, guitarist Ernest Ranglin and original members of Buena Vista Social Club, Los Van Van and Irakere. International tours followed including a live performance at the Royal Albert Hall in London for the BBC Proms, televised in full on BBC TV & Radio, and described by The Times as "Nothing Short Of Explosive”.

Havana Meets Kingston was released in November 2017 by ABC Music, VP Records, Baco Records and Cumbancha, and Havana Meets Kingston Part 2 is due for release in October 2021.

Tracklisting

 Havana Meets Kingston - ABC Music, VP Records, Baco Records (2017)

References

External links
Havana Meets Kingston website
Havana Meets Kingston Facebook Page

Reggae
Son cubano
Afro-Cuban jazz
Australian reggae musicians
Australian hip hop musicians
Living people
Obese Records artists
Year of birth missing (living people)